Kill Yourself, My Love (Spanish: ¡Suicídate, mi amor!) is a 1961 Mexican film. It was written by Luis Alcoriza.

External links
 

1961 films
Mexican comedy-drama films
1960s Spanish-language films
1960s Mexican films